Wojciech Wojdak (born 13 March 1996) is a Polish swimmer. He competed in the men's 400 metre freestyle event at the 2016 Summer Olympics. He won silver medal at the 2017 World Aquatics Championships in Budapest in the 800 metre freestyle.

References

External links
 

1996 births
Living people
Olympic swimmers of Poland
Swimmers at the 2016 Summer Olympics
People from Brzesko
Swimmers at the 2014 Summer Youth Olympics
Medalists at the FINA World Swimming Championships (25 m)
World Aquatics Championships medalists in swimming
Polish male freestyle swimmers
21st-century Polish people